This was the first edition of the tournament.

Irina Bara and Ekaterine Gorgodze won the title, defeating Vivian Heisen and Katarzyna Kawa in the final, 6–4, 3–6, [10–6].

Seeds

Draw

Draw

References

External Links
Main Draw

2022 in Spanish tennis
2022 WTA 125 tournaments